Mocis escondida is a species of moth of the family Erebidae. It is found in Brazil (Parana).

References

Moths described in 1901
Endemic fauna of Brazil
escondida